Stachlew  is a village in Gmina Łyszkowice, Łowicz County, Łódź Voivodeship, Poland.

The village has a population of 1,020.

References

 Central Statistical Office (GUS) Population: Size and Structure by Administrative Division - (2007-12-31) (in Polish) 

Stachlew